Depicting African-American children as alligator bait was a common trope in American popular culture in the 19th and 20th centuries. The motif was present in a wide array of media, including newspaper reports, songs, sheet music, and visual art. There is an urban legend claiming that black children or infants were in fact used as bait to lure alligators, although there is no meaningful evidence that children of any race were ever used for this purpose. In American slang, alligator bait is a racial slur for African-Americans.

Popular culture 
The reasons for dubbing black babies "alligator bait" are unknown, but the identification may be a consequence of earlier associations of African crocodilesa relative of American alligatorswith Africa and its people. Gators largely live in the swamplands of the Southern United States, which were one place people escaping enslavement hid to evade capture. According to popular legend, enslaved people who disappeared in swamps may have been killed by alligators; children were understood as particularly vulnerable to attacks by alligators, and that identification may have evolved into the bait image. Alligator lore draws from "a shared dread of these reptilian creatures that come out of the water to eat dogs and children."

The alligator bait image is a subtype of the racist pickaninny caricature and stereotype of black children, where they were represented as almost unhuman, filthy, unlovable, unkempt, "unsupervised and dispensible." In 19th and 20th century American popular media, black children were typically depicted with "wide toothy grins, rolling white eyes, shiny dark faces, and uncontrollably kinky hair...Supportive props [included] watermelon, bales of cotton, and alligators...The more vicious scenes devalued black children's lives to the extent that entrepreneurs claimed they were 'dainty morsel,' 'free lunches' or 'gator bait' for carnivorous reptiles." 

Drawings of black babies luring alligators were printed by companies like Underwood & Underwood on postcards, cigar boxes, and sheet music covers, The trope also appeared in films and in paintings. The sheet music drawings were almost purely symbolic; the images of black children being hunted by alligators were not represented in almost any corresponding music, though other songs (without the iconography) did have alligator bait as a component. In general, the drawings reinforced the racist belief that black people were victims to nature, and that their race made it reasonable to assume they should die terribly. Alligator-bait-themed postcards and greeting cards were part of a larger genre of anti-black racist ephemera known as coon cards. American Mutoscope and Biograph Company produced a pair of short films in 1900 called The 'Gator and the Pickaninny and Alligator Bait. In the former, "a black man with an ax unhesitatingly attacks an alligator that has swallowed a small black boy; as a result, the boy, Jonah-like, is restored." In the latter, according to the film-company catalog, "A little colored baby is tied to a post on a tropical shore. A huge 'gator comes out of the water, and is about to devour the little pickaninny, when a hunter appears and shoots the reptile." Due to the popularity of the idea, letter openers were manufactured in designs resembling alligators, some of which came equipped with small replicas of black children's heads to be placed in the alligator's mouth.

The title "Alligator Bait" for an 1897 collage of nine African-American babies posed "on a sandy bayou" was supposedly suggested by a hardware-store employee in Knoxville, Tennessee as part of a naming contest with a cash prize. In 1964, a New Jersey editorial writer recalled a copy of the photo—meant to "elicit an amused appreciation"—that had once hung in a local shop. The newspaper editor described the image as "immoral" and equivalent to "viciously pornographic pictures." American studies professor Jay Mechling concludes his essay (about how alligators are used in cultural messaging) on a similar note:

Adult black males were presented in a  similar manner as the babies: A 2003 Museum of Florida History exhibit called The Art of Hatred: Images of Intolerance in Florida Culture included postcards that "depict black people getting eaten by alligators as a joke. 'Free lunch in the Everglades, Florida' reads one." Such postcards were common well into the 1950s. The image of black children being put in peril to lure alligators remains present in popular culture in the 21st century.

In her 1994 book Ceramic Uncles & Celluloid Mammies: Black Images and Their Influence on Culture, Patricia Turner, an African American studies professor who has researched the alligator bait cultural phenomenon, notes that stories of "alligator bait" are invariably narrated by whites, sometimes grouping "Negroes and dogs" together as similarly overawed with fear of alligators. There are no equivalent stories in 19th and 20th century black folklore collections.

Turner argues that the repetitive, insistent "alligator bait" iconography of partially clothed young children placed in danger of predation by large reptiles is not so much a stereotype or an urban legend as wishcasting: "They implicitly advocate...aggression in eliminating an unwanted people...the alligator is an accomplice in an effort to eradicate, or at least intimidate, the black."  Mechling is more sexually explicit, arguing that white storytellers use the culturally constructed idea of "alligator-ness" in these images and stories to symbolically emasculate African American and Native American men alike. Claudia Slate, a professor of English at Florida Southern College, makes an analogy to the terroristic practice of lynching in the United States and argues "Containment of African Americans was a top priority for southern whites, and instilling fear, whether by actual ropes or imagined reptile attacks, served this purpose."

Historicity debate  
The idea that anyone was intentionally using children for alligator hunting was debunked in print as early as 1918; a Florida guidebook reassured potential tourists that "upon reliable authority [an alligator] will not attack a human, regardless of the fiction that pickaninnies are good alligator bait." In 1919 a Port St. Lucie newspaper column complained, "Many years ago this serious error was perpetrated on Florida by an advertising agent of a railroad running through the South...Florida's portion was [advertised with] pictures of moss hung swamps, rattlesnakes, alligators, and negro babies labelled 'alligator bait'... this harmful psychology became very popular..doubtless many foreigners believing that these babies were actually used for alligator bait." In 1926 a columnist for The Eustis Lake Region called it "a piece of Florida fiction going the rounds which ancient spinsters in snowbound lands delighted to repeat as truth. It gave them a feeling of virtuous superiority over the denizens of the pleasant land of Florida."
 
In May 2013, Franklin Hughes of the Jim Crow Museum of Racist Memorabilia at Ferris State University in Michigan argued that due to the number of periodicals which mention the use of black children as bait for alligators, it likely occurred, though it was not widespread or became a normal practice. Hughes essentially argues that since there was no discernible limit to the dehumanization and degradation of African Americans in the U.S. national history, feeding children to animals for sport cannot be precluded as a possible reality. Four years later, Hughes argued again that it likely occurred, though he also found an article from Time magazine, contemporaneous to one alleged incident printed in newspapers, which denied that the practice ever occurred and that the report was a "silly lie, false and absurd". In the 19th and early 20th century several stories were printed in American newspapers about the alleged practice. Academics have not assessed the authorship and likely veracity of these scattered news items, but Snopes article from 2017 was unable to find any meaningful evidence that the practice occurred; Patricia Turner told Snopes it likely never did. The Snopes writer said it was impossible to prove a negative claim, and that no proponents of the historicity of the practice have met their burden of proof by providing any evidence of the practice, although the trope of black children being the favorite food of alligators was already widespread in the antebellum United States. Jay Mechling's study of the American folklore of the alligator notes that "A common folk idea among whites is that alligators have a preference for blacks as a food source." For example, a 1850 article in Fraser's Magazine reported that alligators "prefer the flesh of a negro to any other delicacy". Per Mechling, the earliest instance of this lore is in a 1565 slave trader's account, and as late as the mid-20th century, in a story by Florida writer Marjorie Kinnan Rawlings, a gator forgoes a group of naked white guys for the opportunity to gorge itself on an individual black man instead.

Linguistic use 
In American slang, alligator bait (or gator bait) is a chiefly Southern slur aimed at black people, particularly children; the term implies that the target is worthless and expendable. A variant use, albeit also expressing distaste, was alligator bait as World War II-era U.S. military slang for prepared meals featuring chopped liver. The use of alligator bait to mean poor food (poor in senses of both flavor and socioeconomic class) had fallen out of use in the military by 1954.

The derogatory use of alligator bait is likely pre-Civil War in origin. In 1905 a Vienna, Georgia paper reported high cotton prices and wrote "The bench-legged pickaninny, once so attractive as alligator bait, is now tenderly nurtured and gets three 'squares' a day, for on him hangs the future hopes of big crops." In 1905 a postcard with no alligator imagery but picture of a crying black baby was sent to one Delia with the message "this is great alligator bait." In 1923 the Moline, Illinois sports page reported "The Plows used a wee hunk of alligator bait as bat boy yesterday, but the luck turned the other way. At any rate it must be admitted that the little fellow's presence added color." University of Florida fans were using the "uncomplimentary phrase" against Georgia Tech Yellow Jackets players in 1939. 

Alligator bait appears in the lyrics of a 1940s swing-era jazz song called "Ugly Chile" (originally published 1917 as "Pretty Doll" by Clarence Williams). The version recorded by George Brunies goes: "Oh how I hate you You alligator bait you You knock-kneed, pigeon-toed, box-ankled too, There's a curse on your family and a spell on you." The song, which ends with a joke shared between performer and audience, is described as a "exorcism of an unacceptable fact" that is "funny and cogent in even the most unprivileged of readings.

In 1968 Major League Baseball pitcher Bob Gibson recalled the slur being used against him while playing in Columbus, Georgia: "There was a particular fan there who used to ride me. He called me alligator bait. But then I found out just for kicks local folks would tie Negro youngsters to the end of a rope and drag them through swamps, trying to lure the alligators...That's where Negroes stood in Columbus." The Columbus sports page editor wrote a column castigating Gibson for bringing it up: "All local citizens, white and Negro, have already recognized [alligator bait] for the myth that it is...I wouldn't be naive enough to deny that there were probably some rough things hurled at Gibson...but swamps and alligators? Really, Bob?" In 2020, the University of Florida ended the "Gator Bait" chant during athletic events; university historian Carl Van Ness said the chant likely started after the 1950s, and though it may not have originated from the racial slur, the two were connected. In the late 1990s African-American UF player Lawrence Wright popularized the phrase "If you ain't a Gator, you must be Gator Bait."

Similar tropes 
The concept of children luring predators separately existed in colonial Ceylon (today's Sri Lanka). Ceylonese children were said to have been used as bait for crocodiles, and several newspapers published stories and drawings of the purported practice.

Image gallery

See also 
 Gator bait (disambiguation)

Notes

Bibliography

References

Primary sources

Further reading

External links 
 
 
  - list of "alligator bait" newspaper reports, analysis of authorship, etc.

Alligators and humans
American legends
Anti-African and anti-black slurs
Anti-black racism in the United States
Florida folklore
Folklore of the Southern United States
History of racism in Florida
History of racism in the United States
History of racism in the cinema of the United States
Stereotypes of African Americans
Urban legends